Armand Jean-François (born 7 March 1874 in Grand-Bourg, Guadeloupe; died 22 September 1938) was a politician from Guadeloupe who served in the French Chamber of Deputies from 1924 to 1928.

References 
 page on the French National Assembly website

1874 births
1938 deaths
People from Grand-Bourg
Guadeloupean politicians
Radical Party (France) politicians
Members of the 13th Chamber of Deputies of the French Third Republic